Harkers is a pub in the city centre of York, in England.

The building was designed by George Townsend Andrews as the headquarters of the Yorkshire Insurance Company.  It was completed in 1847, and lies on St Helen's Square, at its corner with Lendal.  It was grade II listed in 1968.  In the 1990s, it was converted into a pub.  The pub is owned by the Mitchells & Butlers group.  It was renovated in 2022.

The design of the building is inspired by the Palazzo Farnese in Rome.  It is a sandstone building of two storeys, plus a basement and attic.  Its front to St Helen's Square is five bays wide, with an additional bay being an entrance arch to Breary's Court.  The main entrance has a Doric order porch, up five stone steps, with double doors.  There is a prominent frieze under the cornice, reading "YORKSHIRE INSURANCE COMPANY ESTABLISHED MDCCXXIIII".  The Lendal front is also of five bays and of similar design, but all the windows are blocked.

Inside, the original interior survives, including a staircase with a cast iron balustrade, a mahogany counter, doors and panelling, and plasterwork including a cornice.  The boardroom on the first floor has a fireplace in the 18th century style.  The railings in front of the building are also original and form part of the listing.

References

Buildings and structures completed in 1847
Grade II listed pubs in York
St Helen's Square